The Staunton Formation is a geologic formation in Indiana  consisting of sandstone, shale, and coalbeds.

Description

The formation was named by E. R. Cumings to refer to the exposed rocks found near Staunton, Clay County. Later surveys resulted in the inclusion of the Perth Limestone Member into the Staunton Formation, having previously belonged to the Brazil Formation.

The Staunton Formation is made up of sandstone and shale (75 to 150 feet), and coalbeds (up to 8).

References

Geology of Indiana